Ulyanovsk State University (romanized: Ulyanovskiy gosudarstvennyy universitet) (USU) is a public, research university, located in Ulyanovsk, Russia. The university enrolls some 16,000 students in six colleges offering 68 majors and claims considerable international ties.
USU was one of the first among Russian universities to join the Bologna process to reform its Doctoral, Master's and Bachelor's degrees.

USU was established as a part of Moscow State University in Ulyanovsk Oblast, based on the traditions of classical education, by a resolution of Government of the Soviet Union in February 1988. It was formerly Simbirsk People's University, established in 1648. In 1996, the Ulyanovsk affiliate of MSU was reorganized into Ulyanovsk State University. At present, Ulyanovsk State University comprises six institutes, 7 independent faculties, 2 affiliates, 6 learning centres, and many international study centers.

The university enrolls about 16,000 students, among them almost 200 foreign citizens from Europe, Asia, Africa, North America, and South America. Currently, the university employs 1,254 faculty members, including 138 Doctorate and 623 Candidate of Science degree holders.

Ulyanovsk State University offers a range of study options: full and part-time, external, further and distance education programs on undergraduate, graduate and post-graduate levels. A student may choose from 77 majors, 76 post-graduate, 37 medical internship and medical residency programs. In addition, the University provides an opportunity to receive dual degrees in Law and Business. The Ulyanovsk State University Business School also offers MBA degree with focus on international business and finance.

General information
USU offers a range of study options: full and part-time, external, extended, distance education programs on undergraduate, graduate and post-graduate levels. There are 68 majors, 66 post-graduate, 29 residency training, and 14 internship programs available. USU offers the opportunity of enrolling in dual degree programs.

Academics

 Institute of Economics and Business Administration, Top Russian Business School
 Russian-American Faculty
 Russian-German Faculty
 Faculty of Physics and Engineering
 Faculty of Mathematics and Information Technology
 Institute of Law and Public Service
 Institute of Medicine and Ecology 
 Faculty of Humanities 
 Faculty of Culture and Arts

Public organizations

For over 10 years, USU has enjoyed a strong relationship with the German-Russian Friendship Society in Ulyanovsk's sister-city Krefeld. The German partners have offered generous financial, material and technical assistance and helped arrange internships for USU students with major German companies. For several years, USU has provided translation assistance to city administrations of Ulyanovsk and Krefeld, which exchange regular visits as part of their close collaboration. USU theatre majors have for a few years enjoyed the opportunity to visit the partner city where they performed and attended master-classes at the invitation of Krefeld city council. Currently, USU with the assistance of Krefeld German-Russian Friendship Society and German Embassy in Russia is discussing with DAAD, German academic exchanges council, the possibility of having its representative on the university campus, who would among other things oversee preparation courses for DSH, or German as a foreign language exam.

Since 1997, USU has maintained a relationship with the Russia Culture Center in (Seoul, South Korea).

Among recent developments is participation in Oxford Russia Fund program, which provided 75 scholarships for USU humanities majors for the 2006–2007 academic year.

To promote academic exchanges, USU arranges regular meetings with coordinators of international educational organizations including ACTR-ACCELS, IREX, Fulbright Foundation.

Research

Research at USU is conducted by all academic unitsinstitutes and faculties, each having at least one research team. The principal research areas addressed by USU scholars are: nuclear power engineering, aerospace industry, laser and nanotechnologies, general and specific engineering, automobile manufacturing, microelectronics and machine engineering, CALS technologies applications for aircraft, automobile and machine engineering, bio technologies and medicine, environmental protection.

USU faculty engaged in medical research are active participants of the anti-tobacco campaign launched by European Respiratory Society. Another research project in medicine is carried out jointly with the neurology hospital of the University of Düsseldorf and the neurology institute of Russian Academy of Sciences.

A number of research projects in the field of mathematics and Information Technology are being  implemented in cooperation with Jyvaskyla University (Finland) and Texas Tech University (USA). Besides, USU is discussing with the latter the possibility of arranging annual internship and traineeship opportunities for its students and faculty on Texas Tech campus.

USU research center in sociology "Region" has, since 1993, worked in close partnership with the University of Birmingham, implementing among other things regular post-graduate student exchanges. Besides Great Britain, "Region" staff enjoy internship opportunities with partner institutions in Germany, Italy, Belgium. Currently, the researchers are exploring such issues as youth cultures, lifestyles, gender issues and multiculturalism as part of projects supported by European Commission and various international foundations.

Partners

One of the top USU priorities is developing and carrying out joint educational programs in cooperation with a number of universities and colleges from the United States, Germany, India and China; Wesleyan College (Macon, Georgia), Shenandoah University (Winchester, Virginia), University of Osnabrück, (Osnabrück, Germany), Duisburg-Essen University (Duisburg, Germany), Jaro Institute of Technology, Management and Research (India), Hunan Normal University (China) are some of the main partners of the university.

From the last three years, the exchanges have provided study abroad opportunities to almost 100 students from Russian-American Faculty and Russian-German Faculty. Since 2001, USU has conducted summer cultural-academic programs for students, faculty and administrators from foreign partner-institutions. The time in Ulyanovsk, which provides visiting students with insights into Russian economy and culture, is typically counted toward their degree. All in all, USU has arranged 9 programs for 140 foreign guests.

Becoming, in 1999, a co-founder of Italian-Russian Institute of Research and Education, USU has provided many students and faculty members with a chance to participate in international summer schools hosted each year by a different member institution.

Over the last two years, USU has signed cooperative agreements with the University of Palermo, Hochschule Niederrhein (Germany), Masaryk University (Czech Republic), Utemisov West-Kazakhstan State University (Republic of Kazakhstan). In addition, cooperative agreements are being completed with East Tennessee State University, La Grange College (USA), Freiberg Technical University Bergacademie (Germany) and about 30 higher educational institutions from the former Soviet Union republics.

In April 2012, USU signed an agreement for a joint Russian-Indian International MBA Program with Jaro Institute of Technology, Management and Research (Mumbai). JARO Education is a company which provides services in the field of education, including professional and vocational training and development in India and across the world via web-based and classroom-based instruction. The agreement's purpose is to provide a framework for academic exchange and joint MBA training of working professionals in India and other Asian countries, including UAE, Bangladesh, Sri Lanka, South Africa Republic, Singapore, Hong Kong, Indonesia, Kuwait, Vietnam, Thailand, Bahrain, Cambodia, Burma and the Philippines.

International Saint-Exupéry Centre

On , the university inaugurated its new International Saint-Exupéry Centre, led by its Director, Elena Mironova, an associate professor of French. The center will serve as a permanent museum dedicated to the French author-aviator Antoine de Saint-Exupéry, as well as a cultural and linguistics center for the university. The museum was established with the assistance of Civil Aviation College teacher Nikolai Yatsenko, an author of 12 publications on Saint-Exupéry who personally donated some 6,000 related items.  The university's new center will also help support the study of international languages in a city which is promoting itself as a major aerospace and cultural centre. The opening was attended by Ulyanovsk Governor  Sergey Morozov, Sergey Krasnov of the Ulyanovsk Civil Aviation College and other aerospace and academic dignitaries, as well as Veronique Jober, Sorbonne professor of Slavic languages, addressing the audience by video link from Paris.

International students
The first international students were enrolled in USU undergraduate study programs in 1991, in residency training programs in 1999, and post-graduate programs in 2004. At the moment, USU enrolls about 120 international students from 25 countries. Over the years, about 70 foreign citizens have been awarded USU diplomas. 
Since 2000, USU hosts an affiliate of National Russian Language Test Center, which administers tests to any foreign citizen willing to have official proof of their knowledge of Russian by obtaining an internationally recognized certificate.

References

External links

 
   -rating of Russian Universities
   -rating of Top 50 Russian Business Schools, 2014, Expert Ranking Agency

1988 establishments in Russia
Antoine de Saint-Exupéry
Buildings and structures in Ulyanovsk Oblast
Business schools in Russia
Educational institutions established in 1988
Public universities and colleges in Russia
Ulyanovsk
Universities and institutes established in the Soviet Union
Universities in Volga Region